Baltit Fort is a fort in the Hunza valley, near the town of Karimabad, in the Gilgit-Baltistan region of northern Pakistan. Founded in the 8th century CE, it has been on the UNESCO World Heritage Tentative list since 2004.

The Mirs of Hunza abandoned the fort in 1945, and moved to a new palace down the hill. The fort started to decay which caused concern that it might possibly fall into ruin. Following a survey by the Royal Geographical Society of London a restoration programme was initiated and supported by the Aga Khan Trust for Culture Historic Cities Support Programme. The programme was completed in 1996 and the fort is now a museum run by the Baltit Heritage Trust.

Awards and recognition
2005 Time Asia, Best of Asia Award

Gallery

Bibliography
 Biddulph John, Tribes of Hindoo Koosh, The Superintendent of Government Printing-Calcutta, India 1880, Reprint: Ali Kamran Publishers, Lahore-Pakistan, 1995.

See also
Altit Fort
Shigar Fort
Khaplu Fort
List of forts in Pakistan
List of museums in Pakistan

References

External links

Official website of the Baltit Heritage Trust
Baltit Fort at Google Cultural Institute

Forts in Gilgit-Baltistan
Aga Khan Trust for Culture projects
Hunza
History of Gilgit Agency
Buildings and structures in Gilgit-Baltistan
History of Baltistan
Restoration of historic architecture in Pakistan
UNESCO Asia-Pacific Heritage Awards winners